The Japanese haiku has been adopted in various languages other than Japanese.

English

The imagist poets Ezra Pound and Amy Lowell wrote what they called hokku. Their followers were the Buddhist poet Paul Reps and the Beat poets, including Jack Kerouac.

The first English-language haiku magazine was American Haiku (1963-1968).

French

French poets who have written haiku in French include Paul-Louis Couchoud (1905), Paul Claudel (1942), Seegan Mabesoone and Nicolas Grenier. Georges Friedenkraft (fr) (2002) considers that haiku in French, due to the less rhythmic nature of the French language, often include alliterations or discrete rhymes, and cites the following Haiku by Jacques Arnold (1995) as an example:
"Jasons : Dieu merci
Ça sent si bon sa forêt
La soupe au persil."

Subsequent to Paul-Louis Couchoud’s popularisation of the form in France through his essays and translations, the next major haiku collection to appear there was the sequence of war poems by Julien Vocance, Cent visions de guerre (1916). Later haiku by him were included among the work of the twelve published together in the Nouvelle Revue Française (No. 84, September 1920), among whom was the young Paul Éluard. This was followed by the anthology Le Haïkaï Français in 1923.

German

Haiku have found a foothold in German poetry since the 1920s, with examples from Rainer Maria Rilke, Franz Blei, Yvan Goll, Peter Altenberg, Alfred Mombert and Arno Holz among others being cited. The collection Ihr gelben Chrysanthemen! by :de:Anna von Rottauscher (Vienna 1939) was published in the 1930s. Also written in the 1930s, haiku by Imma von Bodmershof appeared in book-form in 1962 and were republished in Japan in 1979 as "Löwenzahn: die auf 17 Silben verkürzten Haiku".

In 1988, Margaret Buerschaper founded the German Haiku Society (Die Deutsche Haiku-Gesellschaft e. V.).

Spanish

Authors in Spain who have written haiku in Spanish include Federico García Lorca, Antonio Machado, Juan Ramón Jiménez and Luis Cernuda. Many other writers across Latin America, including Jorge Luis Borges, have also used the form. A translation of Bashō's Oku no Hosomichi to Spanish was done in 1957 by the Mexican poet and Nobel Prize winner Octavio Paz in collaboration with Japanese diplomat Eikichi Hayashiya.

Italian
Gabriele D'Annunzio experimented with the haiku in the early twentieth century. In Italy, the national haiku association was founded in Rome in 1987 by Sono Uchida, the well-known Japanese haijin and the ambassador of Japan in Vatican. Soon after, the national association called Italian Friends of the haiku (Associazione Italiana Amici dell'Haiku) was established, and then the Italian Haiku Association. The poet Mario Chini (1876 - 1959) published the book of haiku titled "Moments" (Rome, 1960). Later, Edoardo Sanguineti published some of his haiku. The famed poet Andrea Zanzotto also published a collection of haiku in English, which he translated back into his native Italian (Haiku for a Season / Haiku per una stagione, Chicago: U. of Chicago Press, 2021).

Portuguese

Brazil 
In Brazil, haiku can also be called haikai or haicai.

According to Goga (1988), the first Brazilian haiku writer was Afrânio Peixoto, in 1919, through his book Trovas Populares Brasileiras, although who popularized the poetry was Guilherme de Almeida, who published the 1937 magazine article Os Meus Haicais and the collection Poesia Vária, in 1947, although the collection was not exclusively of haiku.
Almeida had his own interpretation of the metric structure, title and rhyme of haiku. In the structure proposed by Almeida, the first verse  rhymes with the third one, and the second verse has an internal rhyme, with the second syllabe rhyming with the seventh one. Almeida's haiku form still has many adepts in Brazil.

Another interpretation of haiku is the traditionalist one, promoted by Japanese immigrants and descendants, like Hidekazu Masuda Goga and Teruko Oda. It defines haiku as a poem written in simple language, without rhymes, and following the metric of 17 syllabes: 5 in the first verse, 7 in the second one and 5 in the third one.

Goga attributes the source of haiku in its original language to the Japanese immigrants, beginning with the arrival of the Kasato Maru ship in the Port of Santos, in June 18, 1908. In the ship was Shuhei Uetsuka (1876-1935), a good haiku writer known as Hyôkotsu.

It was in the 1930s that the exchange and diffusion of haiku between Japanese and Brazilian haikuists took place, thus constituting another path of haiku in Brazil. It was also in that decade that the oldest collection of haiku appeared, called Haikais, by Siqueira Júnior, published in 1933 and composed of 56 haiku. Fanny Luíza Dupré was the first woman to publish a book on haiku, in February 1949, entitled Pétalas ao Vento – Haicais. Haiku routes in Brazil can be summarized chronologically as:

 In 1879, through the book Da França ao Japão, by Francisco Antônio Almeida.

 In 1909, through the Japanese immigration.

 In 1919, through the book Trovas Populares Brasileiras, by Afrânio Peixoto.

 In 1926, through the cultivation and diffusion of haiku within the Japanese colony by Keiseki and Nenpuku.

 In the decade of 1930, through the exchange between Japanese and Brazilian haikuists.

 In 1983, Paulo Leminski wrote a biography of Matsuo Bashō. He also wrote various haiku.

With the dissemination of haiku in Portuguese, some schools of thought were formed:

 Those who advocate the content of haiku and consider some characteristics of the poem to be peculiar, such as conciseness, condensation, intuition and emotion, which are linked to Zen Buddhism. Oldegar Vieira is a haikuist who adhered to this thought.

 Those who consider the form (teikei) to be the most important and follow the rule of 17 poetic syllables (5-7-5), like Guilherme de Almeida.

 Those who consider the kigo, the term or word that indicates the season of the year, to be important in the construction of haiku. Jorge Fonseca Júnior is one of them.

Names such as Afrânio Peixoto, Millôr Fernandes, Guilherme de Almeida, Waldomiro Siqueira Júnior, Jorge Fonseca Júnior, José Maurício Mazzucco, Wenceslau de Moraes, Oldegar Vieira, Osman Matos, Abel Pereira, Fanny Luíza Dupré, Martinho Brüning, Paulo Leminski and Alice Ruiz (who travels around the country conducting workshops on the subject) are important in the history of haiku in Brazil.

Estonian

Traditional haiku have been developed in Estonia since 1960s. Andres Ehin (1940 - 2011) was the most prominent Estonian-language haiku writer of the 20th century; his bilingual English-Estonian collection Moose Beetle Swallow was published in Ireland in 2005. Estonian poets Arvo Mets and Felix Tammi wrote haiku in Russian.

What some people call Estonian haiku is a form of poetry introduced in Estonia in 2009. The so-called "Estonian haiku" is shorter than a Japanese one; the syllable count in Japanese haiku is 5+7+5, while Estonian haiku also goes in three lines but only comprises 4+6+4 syllables. Estonian authors claim that this is a distinctively Estonian form.

Asko Künnap is credited as the inventor of Estonian haiku. The first collection of Estonian haiku was published in 2010: Estonian Haiku by poets Asko Künnap, Jürgen Rooste, and Karl Martin Sinijärv. An Estonian-language haiku competition was organized at the 2011 Helsinki Book Fair where Estonia was the guest of honor. A selection of Estonian haiku has been published by the Estonian Writers' Union's magazine Looming ("Creation"). Estonian haiku have been actively translated into Finnish.

Gujarati 
Jhinabhai Desai introduced Haiku in Gujarati literature and popularized it. Soneri Chand Rooperi Suraj (1967) is the collection of 359 haiku and six Tanka poems. Kevalveej (1984) and Sunrise on the Snowpeaks are his other haiku collections. Dhiru Parikh published Haiku collection titled  Aagiya in 1982.

Arabic
Haiku poetry is a relatively new practice in the Arabic literature. It wasn't until 2010 when the first book was published by a Syrian writer Muhammad Adimah containing 1000 haiku translated from Japanese directly. Although most of the Arab haiku poets use the three short lines structure, this has not always been considered as a strict rule. Literary critics in the Arab world have not reached an agreement yet whether the haiku poems written by the young poets can be considered a new form of poetry or merely a different name for the (already popular) flash fiction. In July 2015, the Poetry Letters Magazine acknowledged the Arabic haiku as a distinct form of poetry by publishing, for the first time, haiku poems of 11 Arab poets from Syria, Morocco, Iraq, Jordan, and Tunisia.

Armenian
A collection of 63 haikus in Western Armenian, titled Armenian Haiku (Հայերէն հայքու, Hayeren Haiku) was authored by Garin Angoghinian, an Armenian-American, and was published in 2021.

References

Haikai forms